KPBE (89.3 FM, La Radio Cristiananetwork) was a radio station broadcasting a religious broadcasting music format. Licensed to Brownwood, Texas, United States. The station was last owned by Paulino Bernal Evangelism. Bernal surrendered the license for KPBE and five other stations to the Federal Communications Commission on Nov. 7, 2013.

References

External links
 

PBE
Defunct radio stations in the United States
Radio stations disestablished in 2013
Defunct religious radio stations in the United States
2013 disestablishments in Texas
PBE